"The Hanging Garden" is a song by English rock band the Cure, released as the sole single from their fourth studio album, Pornography. The release is sometimes referred to as A Single. The single reached No. 34 in the UK Singles Chart.

Release 
In addition to being issued as a 7" single with The Cure’s earlier single  "Killing an Arab" on the B-side, "The Hanging Garden" was also released in a deluxe edition known as A Single, formatted both as a gatefold double pack of 7" singles with a total of four tracks, and also as a 10” EP including a live recording of “Killing An Arab” and the studio version of “A Forest” from the band’s second album.

Music video
The video shows the band playing in the York House Gardens in London, England. The band also wears masks, which is similar to the concept of the Pornography album. Robert Smith recalled: "For the 'Hanging Garden' video we got two people who did Madness videos but it was a really awful video. They wanted to make us look serious and we wanted them to make us look like Madness". The video was directed by Chris Gabrin.

Reception 
At the time of its release, NME writer Adrian Thrills was not impressed with the single, writing, "The Cure have drifted disappointingly and indulgently from the idyllic pop invention of their younger days". BBC Radio 1 DJ John Peel went on to include the song at No. 25 in his Festive Fifty list for 1982. 

In a retrospective review for AllMusic, Stewart Mason wrote that the song was heavily influenced by Siouxsie and the Banshees. "The urgent, thundering drums that underpin "The Hanging Garden" are clearly some sort of homage to Budgie, who provided very similar drum patterns to years' worth of Siouxsie & the Banshees songs. Similarly, Simon Gallup's bass borrows something from Steven Severin's insistent throb, and Smith's own guitar is primarily used for drones and ornamentation, much as it was in the Banshees".

Track listing
 "The Hanging Garden"
 "Killing an Arab" (live)

Double pack
Side A
 "The Hanging Garden"
 "One Hundred Years"
Side B – recorded April 27, 1982, at the Manchester Apollo
 "A Forest" (live)
 "Killing an Arab" (live)

Personnel
Simon Gallup – bass
Robert Smith – guitar, keyboard, vocals
Lol Tolhurst – drums

References

External links
The Hanging Garden single at the Cure official site
The Hanging Garden video at the Cure official site

The Cure songs
1982 singles
Songs written by Robert Smith (musician)
Song recordings produced by Phil Thornalley
1982 songs
Fiction Records singles
Songs written by Lol Tolhurst
Songs written by Simon Gallup